Francisco Martínez Soria (December 18, 1902 – February 26, 1982) better known as Paco Martínez Soria was a Spanish actor. He was born in Tarazona, Zaragoza, Aragon.

Biography
Although he was born in Tarazona, he was only five when his family moved to Barcelona, where he went to school. He worked as a clerk and then as a salesperson. At the same time he participated in performances of local theatre groups in Gràcia.

During the Spanish Civil War he left his work and focused on theatre as an amateur actor. In 1938 he debuted in Teatro Fontalba with the theatre company of Rafael López Somoza with the work Antonio pasó el infierno (Antonio goes to hell). Two years later he founded his own theatre company with which he worked during the 1940s from Teatro Urquinaona and in the 1950s from Talía theatre.

In 1934 he collaborated as an extra in the black and white comedy Sereno with director Ignacio F. Iquino. He continued working with Iquino in eleven more films. He got his first  leading role in 1938 in the comedy Paquete, el fotógrafo público número uno (Paquete, the number one public photographer). He continued playing supporting roles in many films until 1944 when he returned to theatre as an actor and entrepreneur.

His name achieved some fame between 1942 and 1944, when he was named director and first actor in the theatre company of Teatro de la Zarzuela.

He returned to cinema in the rolesstudd in 1950s. In 1965 he was very successful with the film La ciudad no es para mí (The city is not for me) directed by Pedro Lazaga. From that moment on, his screen character as an affectionate country bumpkin did not cease to appear in films until his death with his friend Pedro Lazaga.

Filmography

External links
 Official links:
  Sitio Web
  Foro
  Libro de Visitas
 Other Links:
  Paco Martínez Soria. Zaragoza. Aragón. España (Spain)
  Un espacio para Recordar
  Paco Martínez Soria (Culturalia)

1902 births
1982 deaths
People from Tarazona y el Moncayo
Spanish male film actors
20th-century Spanish male actors